Nasi minyak (Palembang Malay for "oily rice") is an Indonesian dish from Palembang cuisine of cooked rice with minyak samin (ghee) and spices. This rice dish is commonly associated with Palembang city, the capital of South Sumatra province. However, it is also common in neighboring Jambi as far north to Medan in North Sumatra. Nasi minyak looks and tastes similar to nasi kebuli, this is because both rice dishes are influenced by Indian and Middle Eastern cuisines, as evidence in the use of ghee and certain spices. Bumbu spice mixture being used including cardamom, anise, clove, caraway, cinnamon, onion, garlic and curry powder.

In Palembang, nasi minyak is a celebrative traditional dish usually served for special events and celebrations. Certain mosque in Palembang served free nasi minyak after Jumu'ah Friday mass prayer, every last Friday of the month.

While in Southern Thailand, Peninsular Malaysia and Singapore, the Nasi Minyak is regarded ceremonial dish and usually being eaten during the traditional Malay wedding reception. It also can be found in Pasar Malam. While in the east coast of Malaysia (Kelantan, Terengganu and coastal Pahang) and southern Thailand (Pattani, Yala and Narathiwat), Nasi Minyak is a common breakfast meal.

Side dishes
Nasi minyak is usually served with a variety of side dishes such as; malbi meat, pentol satay, ayam goreng, pickled cucumber, tahu goreng, krupuk, omelette, raisins and sambal buah, a spicy sambal with pineapple.

See also

 Cuisine of Indonesia
 Palembang cuisine
 Nasi biryani
 Nasi goreng
 Nasi gurih
 Nasi lemak
 Nasi uduk
 Coconut rice

References

Palembang cuisine
Indonesian rice dishes